Kanatbek Kedeikanovich Isaev (born 7 February 1975) is a Kyrgyz politician who served as the Speaker of the Supreme Council of Kyrgyzstan. Isaev assumed office on 13 October 2020 after the resignation of Myktybek Abdyldayev.

Isaev is also the founder and chairman of Kyrgyzstan, a centrist political party that was established in 2015 to support then-president Sooronbay Jeenbekov. In 2017, while acting as opposition leader in the Supreme Council, Isaev was arrested by the state security service for allegedly planning riots before the 2017 Kyrgyz presidential election.

References 

Living people
Members of the Supreme Council (Kyrgyzstan)
1975 births